Cardiff RLFC was a professional rugby league team based in Cardiff, Wales, which played a single season in the Rugby Football League, finishing second bottom in 1951-52. The club withdrew because of low attendances. The club played for a time at Penarth Road.

See also

Sport in Cardiff 
Rugby league in Wales

References

Defunct rugby league teams in Wales
Welsh rugby league teams
Rugby league in Wales
Sport in Cardiff